Pedro Miguel Morais Alves (born 8 February 1979) is a Portuguese former professional footballer who played as a goalkeeper.

Playing career
Born in Lisbon, Alves spent the better part of his 21-year senior career in the lower leagues. Over four seasons, he appeared in 22 Primeira Liga matches, four for C.F. Os Belenenses, 11 for C.F. Estrela da Amadora and seven for Vitória de Setúbal. His debut in the competition was made with the first of those sides on 12 February 2006, in a 0–2 home loss to FC Porto.

Alves signed with C.D. Cova da Piedade in June 2014, aged 35. In the 2015–16 campaign, he was part of the squad that reached the LigaPro for the first time in the club's history, as champions following a penalty shootout against F.C. Vizela.

From 2016 to 2018, Alves played a further 76 matches in the second division, with the team always managing to stay afloat. He announced his retirement on 12 May 2018, at 39.

Coaching career
Immediately after retiring, Alves was hired as goalkeeper coach at Belenenses SAD. He later worked with the same manager, Silas, at Sporting CP and F.C. Famalicão.

References

External links

National team data 

1979 births
Living people
Footballers from Lisbon
Portuguese footballers
Association football goalkeepers
Primeira Liga players
Liga Portugal 2 players
Segunda Divisão players
C.F. Os Belenenses players
C.F. Estrela da Amadora players
Vitória F.C. players
C.D. Pinhalnovense players
Clube Oriental de Lisboa players
C.D. Cova da Piedade players
Portugal youth international footballers
Portugal under-21 international footballers